Mark Eliyahu (born 13 July 1982) is an Israeli musician. He plays the kamancheh.

Early life

Eliyahu was born in 1982 in Soviet Dagestan and immigrated to Israel with his parents in 1989. At age 16, he was inspired by Habil Aliyev's performance, a prominent kamancheh player, and moved to Baku, Azerbaijan to learn kamancheh under the guidance of renowned player Adalat Vazirov. Eliyahu's father was a composer, and his mother played the violin.

Musical career
In 1999, Eliyahu participated in The Spirit of the East – a concert and album directed and composed by his father, Peretz Eliyahu, with the participation of the Azerbaijani mugham singers Alim Qasimov and his daughter Farghana Qasimova and other artists. On that year he also performed as a soloist with the Israel Chamber Orchestra of Ramat Gan in an Israeli festival. In 2004, he recorded his first solo album Voices of Judea and performed with his ensemble throughout Europe and Israel. 

In 2019, Mark Eliyahu visited Azerbaijan for the second time and gave a live concert. 

In 2020, he composed and played the theme music for Tehran, the Emmy award-winning Israeli political espionage series.

Eliyahu's work has gained some popularity among Iranian listeners, especially those who attend his concerts in Turkey.

Filmography

References

1982 births
Living people
People from Dagestan
Israeli musicians